Mi-jung, also spelled Mi-jeong, is a Korean feminine given name. The meaning differs based on the hanja used to write each syllable of the name. There are 33 hanja with the reading "mi" and 75 hanja with the reading "jung" on the South Korean government's official list of hanja which may be registered for use in given names.

People with this name include:
Mi-Jung Lee (born 1966), South Korean-born Canadian television news anchor
Park Mi-jeong (born 1968), South Korean rower
Kim Mi-jung (judoka, born 1971), South Korean judoka who competed at the 1992 Summer Olympics
Kim Mi-jung (fencer) (born 1977), South Korean fencer
Kim Mi-jung (sport shooter) (born 1977), South Korean sport shooter
Jin Mi-jung (born 1978), South Korean basketball player
Kim Mi-jung (judoka, born 1978), South Korean judoka who competed at the 2004 Summer Olympics
Kim Mi-jung (racewalker) (born 1979), South Korean race walker
Seo Mi-jung (born 1980), South Korean foil fencer
Nam Gyu-ri (born Nam Mi-jeong, 1985), South Korean actress
M. J. Hur (Korean name Hur Mi-jung, born 1989), South Korean golfer

See also
List of Korean given names

References

Korean feminine given names